Ruski Krstur (Serbian Cyrillic: Руски Крстур; Rusyn: Руски Керестур) is a village in Vojvodina, Serbia. It is located in the municipality of Kula, West Bačka District. The village has a Rusyn ethnic majority. Its population numbered 5,213 in the 2002 census. Ruski Krstur is the cultural centre of the Rusyns in Serbia. The number of Rusyns in Ruski Krstur is in constant decline as many of them have moved out to Canada concentrating in the town of North Battleford, Saskatchewan .
The village is the seat of the Greek Catholic Eparchy of Ruski Krstur, part of the wider Greek Catholic Church of Croatia and Serbia.

Name
Its name means "the Rusyn Krstur" (There is also a village called Srpski Krstur, meaning "the Serb Krstur", in Vojvodina).

The Hungarian name for the village derived from the Hungarian word "kereszt", which means "cross" in English. "Ur" (úr) means "lord." "Keresztúr," as seen in the Hungarian place name "Bodrogkeresztúr," likely refers to a crucifix (Our Lord on the Cross on the Bodrog river - suggesting that more places called Keresztúr were known). The first written record of Ruski Krstur was made during the administration of the Kingdom of Hungary in 1410 and then in 1452, mentioning it under name Kerezthwr.

In Hungarian the village is known as Bácskeresztúr; in Slovak as Ruský Kеrеstur; and in Croatian as Ruski Krstur, in Rusyn Руськый Керестур.

Ethnic groups

1971
According to the 1971 census, ethnic Rusyns comprised 99.45% of population of the village.

2002
According to the 2002 census, the population of the village include:
Rusyns = 4,483 (86.00%)
Serbs = 263 (5.05%)
others.

Historical population

1948: 5,874
1953: 6,115
1961: 5,873
1971: 5,960
1981: 5,826
1991: 5,636
2002: 5,213

Politics
There is an initiative among inhabitants of Ruski Krstur that this settlement become its own municipality completely separate from Kula.

See also
List of places in Serbia
List of cities, towns and villages in Vojvodina
Pannonian Rusyns
Greek Catholic Eparchy of Ruski Krstur

References
Slobodan Ćurčić, Broj stanovnika Vojvodine, Novi Sad, 1996.

External links

 Ruski Krstur - Web page about the village
 Welcome to First Internet Web Presentation of Ruski Kerestur 
 Rusyns in Serbia
 Vodica in Ruski Krstur
 “A Home for Town Planning Kula-Odzaci” Kula
 Castle, Ruski Krstur
 Rusyn On The Internet

 
Places in Bačka
West Bačka District
Kula, Serbia